Once Upon a Summertime is an album by Blossom Dearie. It was released in 1959 by Verve Records.

Background
This is the third in a series of six albums recorded by Dearie for the Verve label. The liner notes quote Dearie as saying "Norman Granz called and asked me to make another album with Tom Nola.  He had Ray Brown playing bass, Mundell Lowe playing guitar, and Ed Thigpen playing drums. I could pick the songs and write the arrangements. How could a girl go wrong? So, by twisting my arm a few times he seemed to persuade me to go ahead with it...  even though I resisted stubbornly."

Track listing 
"Tea for Two" (Irving Caesar, Vincent Youmans) – 3:20
"The Surrey With the Fringe on Top" (Richard Rodgers, Oscar Hammerstein II) – 4:16
"Moonlight Saving Time" (Irving Kahal, Harry Richman) – 1:59
"It Amazes Me" (Cy Coleman, Carolyn Leigh) – 4:16
"If I Were a Bell" (Frank Loesser) – 3:05
"We're Together" (Steve Allen, Don Elliott) – 2:02
"Teach Me Tonight" (Sammy Cahn, Gene DePaul) – 2:38
"Once Upon a Summertime" (Eddie Barclay, Michel Legrand, Eddy Marnay, Johnny Mercer) – 2:43 
"Down With Love" (Harold Arlen, Yip Harburg) – 1:39
"Manhattan" (Rodgers, Lorenz Hart) – 4:16
"Doop-Doo-De-Doop (A Doodlin' Song)" (Coleman, Leigh) – 2:15
"Our Love is Here to Stay" (George Gershwin, Ira Gershwin) – 3:10

Personnel
Blossom Dearie – vocals, piano
Ray Brown – double bass
Mundell Lowe – guitar
Ed Thigpen – drums

References

1959 albums
Blossom Dearie albums
Verve Records albums
Albums produced by Norman Granz